"A Day in the Life" is a song by the Beatles.

A Day in the Life may also refer to:

Film and television 
 A Day in the Life (film), a 2009 film by Sticky Fingaz
 A Day in the Life (TV series), a 2011 TV series starring Morgan Spurlock
 "A Day in the Life" (Battlestar Galactica), an episode of Battlestar Galactica
 "A Day in the Life" (Without a Trace), an episode of Without a Trace

Music 
 A Day in the Life (band), an American rock band that became Hawthorne Heights

Albums
 A Day in the Life (Eric Benét album)
 A Day in the Life (Jane Siberry album)
 A Day in the Life (Wes Montgomery album)
 Help!: A Day in the Life, a compilation album produced by War Child
 A Day in the Life... a 1998 album by Beres Hammond

Video games
 UFO: A Day in the Life, a 1999 adventure/puzzle video game
 A Day in the Life, a game for the 48K ZX Spectrum

Other uses
 Day in the life, a kind of storytelling that presents a given day in the life of the subject
 Short Trips: A Day in the Life, an anthology of stories based on Doctor Who
 A Day in the Life, a series of photography books created by David Elliot Cohen and Rick Smolan

See also 
 One Day in the Life of Ivan Denisovich
 Life in a Day (disambiguation)
 List of media set within one day